The enzyme (S)-norcoclaurine synthase catalyzes the chemical reaction

4-hydroxyphenylacetaldehyde + 4-(2-aminoethyl)benzene-1,2-diol (Dopamine)  (S)-norcoclaurine + HO

This enzyme belongs to the family of lyases, specifically the hydro-lyases, which cleave carbon-oxygen bonds.  The systematic name of this enzyme class is 4-hydroxyphenylacetaldehyde hydro-lyase [adding dopamine (S)-norcoclaurine-forming]. Other names in common use include (S)-norlaudanosoline synthase, and 4-hydroxyphenylacetaldehyde hydro-lyase (adding dopamine).  This enzyme participates in benzylisoquinoline alkaloid biosynthesis.

References

 
 
 

EC 4.2.1
Enzymes of unknown structure